This is a list of Australian television call signs. When a television broadcaster in Australia is granted a licence, a call sign consisting of a unique series of letters and numbers is allocated by the Australian Communications and Media Authority and are unique for each broadcast station.

Background
For commercial networks, these are generally three letters. The first two letters are selected by the licensee, and the third letter often indicates the state or territory in which the station is located. Sometimes the third letter is also used as part of the abbreviation or mnemonic to name the station - for example GTV (General Television Corporation) represents "General TeleVision" or "General TV", although the V stands for Victoria.

Call signs in Australia do not include ITU prefixes. If one is required, "VL" is used. So, for example, GTV in an international context would actually be "VLGTV".

With the onset of aggregation in regional areas and digital television, the call signs do not retain the meaning that they did in the past. Stations will sometimes change frequency, or have different frequencies at different locations, such as re-transmission sites, where the same signal is re-broadcast in a different area. However, the three-letter codes have generally not changed and are still used within the industry.

A list of call signs is shown below, with original explanations of the call signs as of July 2022.

National
 ABC – Australian Broadcasting Corporation
 SBS – Special Broadcasting Service

New South Wales/Australian Capital Territory

Sydney
 ATN – Amalgamated Television New South Wales
 TCN – Television Corporation New South Wales
 TEN – TEN New South Wales

Southern NSW/Australian Capital Territory
 CBN - Central Broadcasting New South Wales
 CTC - Capital Television Canberra
 WIN - Wollongong Illawarra New South Wales

Northern NSW
 NBN – Newcastle Broadcasting New South Wales
 NEN – New England New South Wales
 NRN – Northern Rivers New South Wales

Griffith/Murrumbidgee Irrigation Area
 AMN – Albury Murray New South Wales        
 MDN   – Murrumbidgee Digital New South Wales
 MTN – Murrumbidgee Television New South Wales

Broken Hill
 BDN – Broken Hill Digital Television New South Wales
 BKN – Broken Hill New South Wales
 SCN – Southern Cross New South Wales

Victoria

Melbourne
 ATV – Austarama Television Victoria
 GTV – General Television Victoria
 HSV – Herald Sun Victoria
 MGV – Melbourne Geelong Victoria

Regional
 AMV  – Albury Murray Victoria                   
 BCV –  Bendigo Central Victoria                                                     
 GLV – Gippsland Latrobe Valley Victoria                      
 VTV – Vic Television Victoria

Mildura and Sunraysia
 MDV – Mildura Digital Television Victoria
 PTV – Prime Television Victoria
 STV – Sunraysia Television Victoria

Queensland

Brisbane
 BTQ – Brisbane Television Queensland
 QTQ – Queensland Television Queensland
 TVQ – TeleVision Queensland

Regional
 RTQ – Rockhampton Television Queensland
 STQ – Sunshine Television Queensland
 TNQ – Telecasters North Queensland

Mount Isa
 IDQ – ITQ Digital Queensland
 IMP – Imparja Television
 ITQ – Mount Isa Telecasters Queensland

South Australia

Adelaide
 ADS – Adelaide South Australia (also said to stand for Advertiser South Australia, named after the sister newspaper The Advertiser and radio station 5AD)
 CTS – Community Television South Australia
 SAS – South Australian Telecasters South Australia
 NWS – The News South Australia

Mount Gambier/South East
 MGS – Mount Gambier South Australia
 SDS – South East Digital Television South Australia
 SES – South East South Australia

Riverland
 LRS – Loxton Riverland South Australia
 RDS – Riverland Digital Television South Australia
 RTS – Riverland Television South Australia

Port Pirie/Spencer Gulf North
 GDS – Spencer Gulf Digital Television South Australia
 GTS – Spencer Gulf Telecasters South Australia
 SGS – Spencer Gulf South Australia

Western Australia

Perth
 NEW – New Western Australia (also to spell the word NEW)
 STW – Swan Television Western Australia
 TVW – Television Western Australia

South West and Great Southern
 SSW – South West and Great Southern Western Australia
 SDW – SSW Digital Western Australia

Kalgoorlie
 VDW – VEW Digital Western Australia
 VEW – View Western Australia

Geraldton
 GDW – GTW Digital Western Australia
 GTW – Geraldton Telecasters Western Australia

Remote and Regional Western Australia
 WAW – Western Australia Western Australia
 WDW – WAW Digital Western Australia
 WOW - WIN of Western Australia

Tasmania
 TDT – Tasmanian Digital Television
 TNT – Television Northern Tasmania
 TVT – TeleVision Tasmania

Northern Territory

Darwin
 DTD – Digital Television Darwin
 NTD – Northern Territory Darwin
 TND – Telecasters Northern Territory Darwin

Other callsigns

Remote Central and Eastern Australia
 CDT – Central Digital Television
 IMP – Imparja Television
 QQQ – Queensland Queensland Queensland
 HPO  – High Power Open Narrowcasting
 ACT – Aboriginal Community Television

Former callsigns
 CWN – Central Western Slopes New South Wales
 ECN – East Coast New South Wales
 RTN – Richmond and Tweed New South Wales
 RVN – Riverina New South Wales
 BTV – Ballarat Television Victoria - (also briefly 'RTV' during aggregation preparations)
 GMV – Goulburn Murray Victoria - (also briefly 'RTV' during aggregation preparations)
 RTV – Regional Television Victoria - (used briefly for BTV and GMV during aggregation preparations)
 CTV - Community Television Victoria
 ABMKQ – Australian Broadcasting Corporation Mary Kathleen Queensland
 DDQ – Darling Downs Queensland
 FNQ – Far Northern Queensland
 MVQ – Mackay Vision Queensland
 SDQ – Southern Downs Queensland
 SEQ – South East Queensland
 WBQ – Wide Bay Queensland
 CTQ – Community Television Queensland
 ACE – Adelaide Community and Educational Television
 BTW – Bunbury Television Western Australia
 GSW – Great Southern Western Australia
 ATW – Access Television Western Australia
 CTN – Community Television New South Wales
 TSN – Television Sydney New South Wales
 CTW – Community Television Western Australia

See also

 List of Australian radio station callsigns
 Television in Australia
 Callsigns in Australia
 Television stations in Australia

References

External links
 
 Includes list of all licensed TV and radio transmitters operating in the broadcasting services bands, with sub-sections organised in different ways.

Call signs